Kloeckner v. Solis, 568 U.S. 41 (2012), is a decision by the Supreme Court of the United States involving federal employee grievance procedures under the Civil Service Reform Act of 1978. The issue was whether a so-called "mixed case" involving both wrongful termination and discrimination claims should be appealed from the Merit Systems Protection Board to a federal district court or to the United States Court of Appeals for the Federal Circuit

The Supreme Court granted certiorari to resolve a circuit split on the issue and ruled unanimously, in an opinion delivered by Justice Elena Kagan, that the statute clearly provided for appeal to a district court in such cases.

Background of the case
In 2006, Carolyn Kloeckner was dismissed from her position in the United States Department of Labor in St. Louis as an employee benefits investigator. Prior to her dismissal, she had filed a complaint with the Equal Employment Opportunity Commission (EEOC) claiming that she had suffered workplace discrimination due to her age and gender. In July 2007, the EEOC terminated proceedings without issuing a judgement and referred it back to the Department of Labor, which affirmed the termination of Kloeckner and claimed she could file an appeal within 30 days to the Merit Systems Protection Board. Kloeckner then filed an appeal with the MSPB, which was created under the Civil Service Reform Act of 1978 to deal with employment decisions of federal agencies, within the 30-day time limit in November 2007. However, the MSPB declared the appeal as untimely and dismissed it on procedural grounds.

Lower court proceedings
Kloeckner then filed a civil complaint in the District Court for the District of Columbia, as her lawyer was from there. The Federal Government then successfully had the venue changed to the federal district court in St. Louis then immediately filed for a dismissal due to lack of jurisdiction. The Civil Service Reform Act directs that cases relating to employee termination are to be heard by the United States Court of Appeals for the Federal Circuit but cases relating to discrimination are referred to a federal district court. Because Kloeckner's case had elements of both, it was classified as a "mixed case" and the federal district court judge noted that there was a circuit split on this issue but judged that jurisdiction to rule on this case was exclusively in the hands of a court of the Eighth Circuit. The Eighth Circuit upheld this ruling on appeal stating that because the MPSB had never resolved the issue of workplace discrimination, only a Federal Circuit Court could rule on the case.

Opinion of the Court

In a unanimous opinion delivered by Justice Elena Kagan, the Court reversed the Eighth Circuit and remanded to the district court. This applies in all cases involving discrimination issues, whether the cases were decided on merit or procedure. The Court criticized the federal government's argument as "construct[ing] such an obscure path to such a simple result", noting that "it would be hard to dream up a more roundabout way of bifurcating judicial review of the MSPB's rulings in mixed cases".

Reactions
Colleen M. Kelley, president of the National Treasury Employees Union, praised the ruling as "provid[ing] a much more clear and rational path" for cases that might otherwise have "ping pong[ed]" through the judicial system, and that the Court's ruling affords discrimination plaintiffs "broader appeal rights."

See also
 2012 term opinions of the Supreme Court of the United States
 2012 term United States Supreme Court opinions of Elena Kagan

References

Further reading
 .
 Gorman, Tricia (November 13, 2012), "Supreme Court hears arguments in MSPB ‘mixed case’ jurisdiction appeal, Thomson Reuters Blog

External links
 

United States Supreme Court cases
United States Supreme Court cases of the Roberts Court
2012 in United States case law
United States Department of Labor
Civil service in the United States
United States administrative case law
United States employment discrimination case law